Salutatorian is an academic title given in the United States,  Armenia, and the Philippines to the second-highest-ranked graduate of the entire graduating class of a specific discipline. Only the valedictorian is ranked higher. This honor is traditionally based on grade point average (GPA) and number of credits taken, but consideration may also be given to other factors such as co-curricular and extracurricular activities. The title comes from the salutatorian's traditional role as the first speaker at a graduation ceremony, delivering the salutation (where the valedictorian, on the other hand, speaks last, delivering the valediction). In a high school setting, a salutatorian may also be asked to speak about the current graduating class or to deliver an invocation or benediction. In some instances, the salutatorian may even deliver an introduction for the valedictorian. The general themes of a salutation and valediction are usually of growth, outlook towards the future, and thankfulness.

Latin salutatorian 
At the universities of Princeton and Harvard a Latin orator, usually a classics major, is chosen for his or her ability to write and deliver a speech to the audience in that language. At Princeton, this speaker is known as the "Latin salutatorian"; at Harvard the Latin oration, though not called a "salutatory" address as such, occurs first among the three student orations, and fulfills the traditional function of salutation.  These traditions date from the earliest years of the universities, when all graduates were expected to have attained proficiency in the "Learned Languages," i.e., Latin and Greek.

Awards 
Salutatorians are usually awarded silver medals, with valedictorians receiving the gold medal during the graduation ceremony.

Notable salutatorians in the U.S. 

 Aravind Adiga, author, winner of the 2008 Man Booker Prize
Jesse L. Brown distinguished US Naval Aviator and first African American Officer to be killed in the Korean War
 Norris Cole, basketball player
 Connie Francis, singer (Belleville High School, New Jersey, Class of 1955)
 James Garfield, the 20th President of the United States (Williams College, Massachusetts, Class of 1842)
 Georgie Anne Geyer, journalist and foreign affairs columnist (Calumet High School, Illinois, Class of 1952)
 John Legend, singer-songwriter
 Brent Liles, bassist for various punk bands Troy High School, Fullerton, California, Class of 1981.
 Evan Mecham, Governor of Arizona (Altamont High School, Utah, Class of 1942)
 Clare Murray, Student at Weston High School (Connecticut) 2014
James "Murr" Murray Actor / Comedian / Impractical Jokers. (Monsignor Farrell High School, Staten Island, Class of 1994)
 Michelle Obama, former First Lady of the United States (Whitney Young High School, Illinois, Class of 1981) 
 Walter O'Malley, sports executive who owned the Brooklyn/Los Angeles Dodgers team in Major League Baseball from 1950 to 1979, University of Pennsylvania
 Bettie Page, pin-up model and Playboy Playmate (Hume-Fogg High School, Tennessee, Class of 1940)
 Robin Roberts, newscaster (Pass Christian High School, Mississippi, Class of 1979)
 Erich Segal, author and screenwriter (Harvard College, Massachusetts, Class of 1958)
 Richard Sherman, an NFL player for the Seattle Seahawks (Dominguez High School, Compton, California, Class of 2006)
 Carrie Underwood, singer-songwriter (Checotah High School, Oklahoma, Class of 2001)
 John Wayne, actor, Academy Award winner (Glendale High School, California, Class of 1924)
 Otto Warmbier, (Wyoming High School, Wyoming, Ohio, Class of 2013)
Keith Whittington- William Nelson Cromwell Professor of Politics at Princeton University.

See also

 
 
 
 
 Hornstine v. Township of Moorestown

References

Academic terminology
Academic honours
Qualifications